Zachary Evans (born May 30, 2001) is an American football running back for the Ole Miss Rebels. A five-star recruit out of North Shore High School in Houston, he began his collegiate career with the TCU Horned Frogs before transferring to Ole Miss in 2022.

High school career 
Evans went to North Shore High School in Houston, Texas. Evans was ranked as a five-star recruit and the number one player in the state of Texas in the 2020 class by 247Sports.com. He was compared to Melvin Gordon of the Denver Broncos. In 2019, Evans broke the teams cell phone rules. He was suspended and not allowed to play in the state championship game. Evans was committed to Georgia but this incident led him to be released from his NLI. Evans would eventually commit to Texas Christian University becoming their schools first ever five-star recruit.

College career

TCU 
As a freshman in 2020, Evans played in nine games totaling 415 yards and four touchdowns. 

In 2021, Evans played in just six games recording 648 yards and five touchdowns. Evan's season would be cut short due to a turf toe injury sustained in a game against Texas Tech.

Ole Miss 
On January 6, 2022, Evans announced he would transfer to Ole Miss. Evans was named to the preseason SEC All-Conference third team. 

Evans played one season at Ole Miss, rushing for 936 yards and nine touchdowns. After playing in the 2022 Texas Bowl, Evans declared for the 2023 NFL Draft.

References

External links 
 TCU Horned Frogs Bio
 Ole Miss Rebels Bio

Living people
TCU Horned Frogs football players
Ole Miss Rebels football players
2001 births
Players of American football from Houston
American football running backs